The 1970 All-East football team consists of American football players chosen by various selectors as the best players at each position among the Eastern colleges and universities during the 1970 NCAA University Division football season.

Offense

Quarterback
 Jim Chasey, Dartmouth (AP-1)
 Mike Sherwood, Virginia (UPI-1)

Running backs
 Ed Marinaro, Cornell (AP-1, UPI-1)
 Fred Willis, Boston College (AP-1, UPI-1)
 Jim Braxton, West Virginia (AP-1 [tight end], UPI-1)

Ends
 Mike Siani, Villanova (AP-1 [wide receiver], UPI-1)
 Joe Albano, Army (AP-1 [wide receiver], UPI-1)

Tackles
 Vic Surma, Penn State (AP-1, UPI-1)
 Bob Donlin, UMass (AP-1)
 Bob Peters, Dartmouth (UPI-1)

Guards
 Bob Holuba, Penn State (AP-1, UPI-1)
 Bill Soucy, Boston University (AP-1)
 Tim Horvath, West Virginia (UPI-1)

Center
 Bob Herb, William & Mary (AP-1)
 Warren Koegel, Penn State (UPI-1)

Defense

Ends
 Jim Gallagher, Yale (AP-1, UPI-1)
 Jim Kelliher, UMass (AP-1)
 Lou Gubitosa, Syracuse (UPI-1)

Tackles
 Joe Ehrmann, Syracuse (AP-1, UPI-1)
 Lloyd Weston, Pittsburgh (AP-1, UPI-1)

Guard
 Ted Lachowicz, Syracuse (AP-1)

Linebackers
 Jack Ham, Penn State (AP-1, UPI-1)
 Dale Farley, West Virginia (AP-1, UPI-1)
 Gary Farneti, Harvard (AP-1)
 Murry Bowden, Dartmouth (AP-1 [back], UPI-1)

Backs 
 Mike Smith, Penn State (AP-1, UPI-1)
 Willie Bogah, Dartmouth (AP-1) 
 Tom Myers, Syracuse (UPI-1)
 George Laudis, Penn State (UPI-1)
 Bryant Salter, Pittsburgh (UPI-1)

Key
 AP = Associated Press
 UPI = United Press International

See also
 1970 College Football All-America Team

References

All-Eastern
All-Eastern college football teams